National Union of Healthcare Workers (NUHW) is an independent, democratic labor union based in Oakland, California, that represents 15,000 healthcare workers in California. It was formed in 2009 after a split with the SEIU United Healthcare Workers West.

History
NUHW was founded in 2009 by former members of United Healthcare Workers-West, a local of the Service Employees International Union (SEIU), after the local was placed in trusteeship by a federal judge. The leaders of SEIU-UHW at that time, including President Sal Rosselli, resisted efforts by SEIU International to control the local's democratic decision-making process against the will of its members and in violation of the local's constitution. The local's leadership (Rosselli) and the international leadership were at odds over the proposed removal of 65 000 long term healthcare workers into the LA based local 6434 run by the corrupt Tyrone Freeman. SEIU International responded by putting the local into trusteeship.

Following SEIU International's implementation of the trusteeship, SEIU-UHW rank-and-file leaders voted to form NUHW, and thousands of member soon voted to leave SEIU-UHW and join NUHW.

References

External links
 Ex-Union Leader Convicted of Embezzlement, Jan 28, 2013
Ex-SEIU local exec convicted of stealing from low-income members, January 28, 2013
New Your Times: Nasty dispute, Jan. 17, 2009
Split decision in hearing on home care workers union, January 13, 2009
NUHW Home Page
IAM Home Page

Trade unions in California
Healthcare trade unions in the United States
Organizations based in Oakland, California
2009 establishments in California
Service Employees International Union
Trade unions established in 2009
Medical and health organizations based in California